Heinrich de Fries (30 November 1887 – 11 September 1938) was a German architect. His work was part of the architecture event in the art competition at the 1928 Summer Olympics.

References

1887 births
1938 deaths
20th-century German architects
Olympic competitors in art competitions
People from Berlin